Guéckédou is a prefecture located in the Nzérékoré Region of Guinea. The capital is Guéckédou. The prefecture covers an area of 4,750 km.² and has a population of 290,611.

Sub-prefectures
The prefecture is divided administratively into 10 sub-prefectures:
 Guéckédou-Centre
 Bolodou
 Fangamadou
 Guendembou
 Kassadou
 Koundou
 Nongoa
 Ouéndé-Kénéma
 Tekoulo
 Termessadou-Dibo

See also
Yinde-Millinou

References 

Prefectures of Guinea
Nzérékoré Region